Vyroneia railway station is a railway station that servers the community of Vyroneia, in  Serres in Central Macedonia, Greece. The station is located just east of the settlement but still within the settlement limits. The station is unstaffed, with the station building now housing a restaurant.

History
The station opened in 1896, the station was known before 1924: Χατζή Μπεηλίκ - Chatzi Beilik Vyroneia was annexed by Greece on 18 October 1912 during the First Balkan War. In the summer (July-August) of 1913, during the final phase of the Second Balkan War. The small station was turned into the headquarters of the Greek army. Here the then King Constantine and Eleftherios Venizelos signed the truce with Lieutenant General Victor Dusmanis and the Bulgaria, leading to Bucharest Treaty that end the war. An inscription marks the occasion in the station's yard. On 17 October 1925 The Greek government purchased the Greek sections of the former Salonica Monastir railway, and the railway became part of the Hellenic State Railways, with the remaining section north of Florina seeded to Yugoslavia. On 20 August 1944, during the German Occupation, a German guard was attacked by ELAS forces. In 1970, OSE became the legal successor to the SEK, taking over responsibilities for most of Greece's rail infrastructure. On 1 January 1971, the station and most of the Greek rail infrastructure where transferred to the Hellenic Railways Organisation S.A., a state-owned corporation. Freight traffic declined sharply when the state-imposed monopoly of OSE for the transport of agricultural products and fertilisers ended in the early 1990s. Many small stations of the network with little passenger traffic were closed down. In 2005 the station building closed (with the station downgraded to that of a holt) and was left abandoned. In 2009, with the Greek debt crisis unfolding OSE's Management was forced to reduce services across the network. Timetables were cutback, routes closed and stations left abandoned as the government-run entity attempted to reduce overheads. Services from Thessaloniki and Alexandroupolis were cut back from six to just two trains a day, reducing the reliability of services and passenger numbers. Close to ruin and in danger of collapse in December 2013, the building was renovated and opened as "ouzo cafe" or "Border Station" restaurant. In 2017 OSE's passenger transport sector was privatised as TrainOSE, currently, a wholly owned subsidiary of Ferrovie dello Stato Italiane infrastructure, including stations, remained under the control of OSE. Platform 1 now houses a small antique railcar.

Facilities
The station's original 19th-century brick-built station is now a restaurant, with the station office converted into a small grocery store selling local and traditional delicacies. As a result, the station is unstaffed, with no staffed booking office or waiting rooms. There is no footbridge over the lines, though passengers can walk across the rails; it is however not wheelchair accessible. There are no digital display screens or timetable poster boards; as a result, the station is currently little more than an unstaffed halt. However the building is well kept. Frequent buses do call at the station.

Services
It is served by two long-distance trains between Thessaloniki and Alexandroupolis. Proastiakos service terminates here, with stopping services to Thessaloniki New Railway Station.

The Tree
Today, in the station's yard stands a huge plane tree with an inscription that records the events of July 1913.

References

External links
 Vyroneia Station - National Railway Network Greek Travel Pages

Railway stations in Central Macedonia
Railway stations opened in 1896